Wedgwood is a neighborhood in Fort Worth, Texas (USA), located on the southwest part of the city. It is bounded by Granbury Rd on the northwest, Altamesa Blvd on the south, McCart Ave & Westcreek Dr on the east, and Interstate 20 on the north.

Most of the streets in Wedgwood begin with a "W", such as Wedgmont, Wrigley and Winifred. Few of the streets have sidewalks.  Houses in Wedgwood are usually all brick with attached garages, and have ranch-style design.  Fort Worth residents know Wedgwood as "being near Hulen Mall".  Newer houses are located near Candleridge Park.  Another park, Le Blanc Park, features tennis courts, soccer fields and a basketball court. The Candleridge community is a middle class area where the houses were built from 1975 to 1981. The nearby man-made lake sets a relaxing mood; most homes price anywhere from $122-400,000.

Schools 
The school zone is the neighborhood Fort Worth Independent School District.

Elementary schools 
 Bruce Shulkey Elementary School
 J. T. Stevens Elementary School
 Westcreek Elementary School
 Trinity Valley School (Private)
 Southwest Christian School (Private)

Middle schools 
 Wedgwood Middle School
 Wedgwood 6th Grade School
 Trinity Valley School (Private)
 Southwest Christian School (Private)

High schools 
 Southwest High School
 Trinity Valley School (Private)
 Southwest Christian School (Private)
 Fort Worth Academy of Fine Arts (Charter)
 Fort Worth Country Day School (Private)

See also 
 List of neighborhoods in Fort Worth, Texas

External links 
Realtor Report

Neighborhoods in Fort Worth, Texas